Marianela Quesada Barrantes (born April 17, 1988) is a Costa Rican swimmer, who specialized in sprint freestyle events. She represented her nation Costa Rica at the 2008 Summer Olympics, and currently holds a Costa Rican national record in both the 50 and 100 m freestyle.

Quesada received a Universality invitation from FINA to compete as Costa Rica's lone female swimmer in the 50 m freestyle at the 2008 Summer Olympics in Beijing. Swimming on the outside in heat six, Quesada could not beat the vastly experienced field to round out the race in last with a time of 28.11. Quesada failed to advance to the semifinals, as she placed fifty-seventh overall out of 92 swimmers in the prelims.

References

External links
NBC 2008 Olympics profile

1988 births
Living people
Costa Rican female swimmers
Olympic swimmers of Costa Rica
Swimmers at the 2008 Summer Olympics
Costa Rican female freestyle swimmers
Sportspeople from San José, Costa Rica
20th-century Costa Rican women
21st-century Costa Rican women